Issa Magometovich Kostoyev (born August 8, 1942) is a Russian government attorney and bureaucrat. He was the representative in the Federation Council from the executive body of state power of the Republic of Ingushetia (2002–2009), and a member of the Federation Council Committee on Defense and Security and Commission on Natural Monopolies. State Counselor of Justice 2 classes.

Early life 
He graduated from Al-Farabi Kazakh National University with a specialty in jurisprudence.

Career 
Kostoyev began working in the prosecutor's offices of North Ossetia, the Chechen-Ingush Autonomous Soviet Socialist Republic, the prosecutor's office of the USSR and the Prosecutor General's Office of the Russian Federation. He headed investigative groups that engaged in the search for Rostov maniac Andrei Chikatilo and Smolensk maniac Vladimir Storozhenko.

He supports the death penalty for serial killers and pedophiles.

Awards and honours
 Order of the Red Banner of Labour (1982)
 Medal "Veteran of Labour" (1989)
 Honoured Lawyer of Russia (1997)
 Order of Honour (2002)
 Order "For Merit to the Fatherland", 4th class (2007)
 Order of Friendship (2022)

References

External links
 «Я чувствовал — он убийца»: интервью со следователем, поймавшим Чикатило

1942 births
Living people
People from Nazranovsky District
Al-Farabi Kazakh National University alumni
Members of the Federation Council of Russia (1994–1996)
Members of the Federation Council of Russia (after 2000)
Plenipotentiary Representatives of the President of the Russian Federation in the regions
Recipients of the Order "For Merit to the Fatherland", 4th class
Recipients of the Order of Honour (Russia)
Recipients of the Order of the Red Banner of Labour
Ingush people
Russian jurists
Russian police officers
Soviet jurists
Soviet police officers